The following lists events that happened during 1993 in the Grand Duchy of Luxembourg.

Incumbents

Events

January – March

April – June
 12 May – SES launches its third satellite, Astra 1C.
 15 May – Representing Luxembourg, Modern Times finish twentieth in the Eurovision Song Contest 1993 with the song Donne-moi une chance de te dire.  , Luxembourg has not entered the Eurovision Song Contest since.

July – September

October – December
 8 October – The satirical newspaper Den Neie Feierkrop is launched.
 10 October – Communal elections are held.
 1 November – The Maastricht Treaty comes into force, creating the European Union.
 Unknown – Italy's Maximilian Sciandri wins the 1993 Tour de Luxembourg.

Deaths
 14 January – Victor Abens, politician
 4 March – Théo Kerg, artist
 28 October – Grégoire Leisen, cyclist

References

 
Years of the 20th century in Luxembourg
Luxembourg